Frank W. O'Brien (January 25, 1918 – May 18, 2006) was a Democratic member of the Pennsylvania House of Representatives.
He was the son of James and Ella (née Cawley) O'Brien.

References

Democratic Party members of the Pennsylvania House of Representatives
1918 births
2006 deaths
20th-century American politicians